Prof. dr. I.G.N.G. Ngoerah General Hospital (or Prof.Ngoerah Hospital) is the largest hospital in Bali. Many of the victims of the 2002 Bali bombings were treated there.

History 
Building work began in 1955, and the hospital was officially opened by President Sukarno on 30 December 1959. In 1962, it started offering medical training in cooperation with the medical faculty of Udayana University. In 1978 it became the referral teaching hospital for the provinces of Bali, East Nusa Tenggara, West Nusa Tenggara and East Timor. In 2005, it became a regional government public service institution (BLUD), and was designated a Class A teaching hospital.

Facilities 
The hospital has a total of 738 beds, and over 500 doctors and more than a thousand nurses on the staff. The hospital has a hyperbaric chamber, radiotherapy facilities and offers radiology and diagnostic imaging services. It also has an integrated cancer therapy unit, intensive care facilities and a burns unit. and carries out kidney transplants and in vitro fertilisation. It provides general checkups, has an HIV therapy center and also conducts research and development. Also on the hospital grounds are a pharmacy, shops and a bank.

References

Hospitals in Indonesia
Bali